The Vocotruyen World Championships, also known as the World Vo Vietnam Vo Co Truyen Championships, are one of the competition for Vietnam martial arts organized by the World Federation of Vietnam Vocotruyen (WFVV).

List of world championships

References

Sporting events in Vietnam